Douglas South is a House of Keys constituency in Douglas, Isle of Man.

Although the constituency is named Douglas South, its current (2020) boundaries place it in the west rather than the south of Douglas.

Like all the Keys constituencies, the constituency returns two members to the House of Keys. Following a General Election in October 2021, the incumbents are Mrs Claire Christian and Sarah Maltby.

MHKs & Elections

The following information is incomplete, and there were also significant boundary changes as the number of constituencies in Douglas increased from two to four.

External links
Constituency maps and general election results

Constituencies of the Isle of Man